Cordell Hull (October 2, 1871July 23, 1955) was an American politician from Tennessee and the longest-serving U.S. Secretary of State, holding the position for 11 years (1933–1944) in the administration of President Franklin Delano Roosevelt during most of World War II.  Before that appointment, Hull represented Tennessee for two years in the United States Senate and 22 years in the House of Representatives.

Hull received the Nobel Peace Prize in 1945 for his role in establishing the United Nations, and was referred to by President Roosevelt as the "Father of the United Nations".

Early life and education

Cordell Hull was born in a log cabin in Olympus, Tennessee, which is now part of Pickett County, Tennessee, but was then part of Overton County. He was the third of the five sons of William Paschal Hull (1840–1923) and Mary Elizabeth Hull (née Riley) (1841–1903). His brothers were named Orestes (1868), Sanadius (1870), Wyoming (1875), and Roy (1881).

According to John Gunther, Hull's father had tracked down and killed a man because of a blood feud. His mother was a descendant of Isaac Riley, who was granted  in near Byrdstown in Pickett County, for Revolutionary War service, as well as Samuel Wood who emigrated from Leicestershire, England on the ship Hopewell and fought in the Virginia Militia. Hull's mother's family (Riley-Wood) had numerous ancestors who fought in the Revolutionary War. Hull devoted a section in his memoirs "Cabin on the Hill" to dispelling an old rumor that his mother was part Cherokee Indian, and subsequent documented family history has confirmed his ancestry.

Hull attended college from 1889 until 1890. He gave his first speech at the age of 16. At the age of 19, Hull became the elected chairman of the Clay County Democratic Party. Hull studied at National Normal University (later merged with Wilmington College, Ohio) from 1889 until 1890.  In 1891, he graduated from Cumberland School of Law at Cumberland University and was admitted to the bar.

Early career
Hull served in the Tennessee House of Representatives from 1893 until 1897. During the Spanish–American War, he served in Cuba as a captain in the Fourth Regiment of the Tennessee Volunteer Infantry.

From 1903 to 1907, Hull served as a local judge; later he was elected to the United States House of Representatives where he served 11 terms (1907–1921 and 1923–1931) totaling 22 years. As a member of the powerful Ways and Means committee, he fought for low tariffs and claimed authorship of the federal income tax laws of 1913 and 1916 and the inheritance tax of 1916. After his defeat in the congressional election of 1920, he served as chairman of the Democratic National Committee. He was one of several candidates for president at the 1928 Democratic National Convention, which ultimately chose Al Smith as nominee. Hull was influential in advising Albert Gore, Sr. to run for the U.S. Congress in 1938. Hull recorded twenty-five years of combined service in the House and the Senate.

Secretary of State

Hull won election to the Senate in 1930, but resigned from it in 1933 to become Secretary of State. Hull became one of Roosevelt's strongest Southern allies during the 1932 presidential campaign.

Roosevelt named him Secretary of State and appointed him to lead the American delegation to the London Economic Conference, which then collapsed when Roosevelt rejected its main plans. In 1943, Hull served as United States delegate to the Moscow Conference. At all times, his main objective was to enlarge foreign trade and lower tariffs. The more important issue of the American role in World War II was handled by Roosevelt who worked through Sumner Welles, the second-ranking official at the State Department. Hull did not attend the summit meetings that Roosevelt had with Winston Churchill and Josef Stalin. In 1943, Hull finally destroyed Welles's career by threatening to expose his homosexuality.

In a speech in 1937, New York City Mayor Fiorello H. La Guardia said that brown-shirted Nazis ought to be featured as the "climax" of a chamber of horrors in the upcoming World's Fair. The Nazi government organ, Der Angriff, called the mayor a "Jewish Ruffian" who had been bribed by Jewish and Communistic agents and was a criminal disguised as an officeholder. In the ensuing exchanges, Hull sent a letter of regret to Berlin for intemperate comments on both sides, but he also explained the principle of freedom of speech. As the response of Nazi propaganda organs rose in pitch to include characterizing American women as "prostitutes," Hull sent a letter of protest to Berlin, which elicited an "explanation" but no apology.

In 1938, Hull engaged in a dialog with Mexican Foreign Minister Eduardo Hay concerning the failure of Mexico to compensate Americans who lost farmlands during agrarian reforms in the late 1920s. He insisted that compensation must be "prompt, adequate and effective". Though the Mexican Constitution guaranteed compensation for expropriation or nationalization, nothing had yet been paid. While Hay admitted Mexico's responsibility, he replied that there is "no rule universally accepted in theory nor carried out in practice which makes obligatory the payment of immediate compensation...." The so-called "Hull formula" has been adopted in many treaties concerning international investment but is still controversial, especially in Latin American countries, which have historically subscribed to the Calvo doctrine, which suggests that compensation is to be decided by the host country and that as long as there is equality between nationals and foreigners and no discrimination, there can be no claim in international law. The tension between the Hull formula and the Calvo doctrine is still important in the law of international investment.

Hull pursued the "Good Neighbor Policy" with Latin American nations, which has been credited with preventing Nazi subterfuge in that region. Hull and Roosevelt also maintained relations with Vichy France, which Hull credited with allowing General Henri Giraud's forces to join allied forces in the North African campaign against Germany and Italy.

Hull also handled formal statements with foreign governments. Notably he sent the Hull note just prior to the Pearl Harbor attack, which was formally titled "Outline of proposed Basis for Agreement Between The United States and Japan." Hull received news of the attack while he was outside his office. The Japanese ambassador Kichisaburō Nomura and Japan's special envoy Saburō Kurusu were waiting to see Hull with a 14-part message from the Japanese government that officially notified of a breakdown in negotiations. The United States had broken Japanese encryption, and Hull knew the message contents. He blasted the diplomats: "In all my fifty years of public service, I have never seen such a document that was more crowded with infamous falsehood and distortion."

Hull chaired the Advisory Committee on Postwar Foreign Policy, which was created in February 1942.

When the Free French Forces of Charles de Gaulle occupied the islands of Saint-Pierre and Miquelon, south of Newfoundland, in December 1941, Hull lodged a very strong protest and went as far as referring to the Gaullist naval forces as "the so-called Free French." His request to have the Vichy governor reinstated was met with strong criticism in the American press. The islands remained under the Free French until the end of the war. Hull, who always held de Gaulle in disregard, if not detestation, even before the incident, would never cease trying to maneuver against him during the rest of the war.

Jews and SS St. Louis incident
In 1939, Hull advised Roosevelt to reject the SS St. Louis, a German ocean liner carrying 936 Jews seeking asylum from Germany. Hull's decision sent the Jews back to Europe on the eve of the Holocaust. Some historians estimate that 254 of the passengers were ultimately murdered by the Nazis.

Okay ...there were two conversations on the subject between (Secretary of the Treasury) Morgenthau and Secretary of State Cordell Hull. In the first, 3:17 PM on 5 June 1939, Hull made it clear to Morgenthau that the passengers could not legally be issued U.S. tourist visas as they had no return addresses. Furthermore, Hull made it clear to Morgenthau that the issue at hand was between the Cuban government and the passengers. The U.S., in effect, had no role. In the second conversation at 3:54 PM on June 6, 1939, Morgenthau said they did not know where the ship was and he inquired whether it was "proper to have the Coast Guard look for it". Hull responded by saying that he didn't see any reason why it could not. Hull then informed him that he did not think that Morgenthau would want the search for the ship to get into the newspapers. Morgenthau said "Oh no. No, no. They would just—oh, they might send a plane to do patrol work. There would be nothing in the papers." Hull responded "Oh, that would be all right."

In September 1940, First Lady Eleanor Roosevelt maneuvered with another State Department official to bypass Hull's refusal to allow Jewish refugees aboard a Portuguese ship, the SS Quanza, to receive visas to enter the U.S. Through her efforts, the Jewish refugees disembarked on September 11, 1940, in Virginia. In a similar incident, American Jews sought to raise money to prevent the mass murder of Romanian Jews but were blocked by the State Department. "In wartime, in order to send money out of the United States, two government agencies had to sign a simple release—the Treasury Department under Henry Morgenthau and the State Department under Secretary Cordell Hull. Morgenthau signed immediately. The State Department delayed, delayed, and delayed, as more Jews were dying in the Transnistria camps."

In 1940, Jewish representatives in the USA lodged an official complaint against the discriminatory policies the State Department was using against the Jews. The results were fatal: Hull gave strict orders to every USA consulate worldwide forbidding the issuing of visas to Jews ... At the same time a Jewish congressman petitioned Roosevelt, requesting his permission to allow twenty thousand Jewish children from Europe to enter the USA. The President did not respond to the petition.

Establishing the United Nations

Hull was the underlying force and architect in the creation of the United Nations, as recognized by the 1945 Nobel Prize for Peace, an honor for which Franklin D. Roosevelt nominated him. During World War II, Hull and Roosevelt had worked toward the development of a world organization to prevent a third World War. Hull and his staff drafted the "Charter of the United Nations" in mid-1943.

Later years
Hull resigned on November 30, 1944, due to failing health. To this day he remains the longest-serving US Secretary of State, having served for eleven years and nine months in the post. Roosevelt described Hull upon his departure as "the one person in all the world who has done his most to make this great plan for peace (the United Nations) an effective fact". The Norwegian Nobel Committee honored Hull with the Nobel Peace Prize in 1945 in recognition of his efforts for peace and understanding in the Western Hemisphere, his trade agreements, and his work to establish the United Nations.

In January 1948, Hull published his two-volume memoirs, an excerpt from which appeared in The New York Times.

Personal life and death
At the age of 45, in 1917, Hull married a widow, Rose Frances (Witz) Whitney (1875–1954), of an Austrian Jewish family of Staunton, Virginia.  The couple had no children.  Mrs. Hull died at age 79, in Staunton, Virginia, in 1954.  She is buried in Washington D.C. at  Washington National Cathedral.

Hull died on July 23, 1955, at age 83, at his home in Washington, D.C., after a lifelong struggle with familial remitting-relapsing sarcoidosis (often confused with tuberculosis). He is buried in the vault of the Chapel of St. Joseph of Arimathea in the Washington National Cathedral.

Legacy
Hull's memory is preserved by Cordell Hull Dam on the Cumberland River near Carthage, Tennessee. The dam impounds Cordell Hull Lake, covering approximately 12,000 acres (49 km2).

His law school, Cumberland School of Law, continues to honor him with a Cordell Hull Speaker's Forum and the Moot Court Room.

Cordell Hull Birthplace State Park, near Byrdstown, Tennessee, was established in 1997 to preserve Hull's birthplace and various personal effects Hull had donated to the citizens of Pickett County, including his Nobel Peace Prize.

A segment of Kentucky highway routes 70, 90, 63, and 163, from Mammoth Cave National Park near Cave City south to the Tennessee State Line near Hestand, is named "Cordell Hull Highway", and is part of that state's scenic byway system.

The Cordell Hull Building, on Capital Hill in Nashville, Tennessee, is a secure 10-story building that contains the offices of the Tennessee Legislature.

The Eisenhower Executive Office Building (formerly the Old Executive Office Building) in Washington, DC, next to the White House, contains the ornately decorated "Cordell Hull Room" on the second floor, which is used for meetings. The room was Cordell Hull's office when he served as U.S. Secretary of State.

The U.S. Postal Service issued a 5-cent commemorative stamp honoring Cordell Hull on October 5, 1963.

Hull is one of the presidential cabinet members who are characters in the musical Annie.

Citations

General and cited sources

Primary 
 Memoirs (Jan. 1948)
 Vol. I, Vol. II
 The Papers of Cordell Hull.

Secondary 
 Dallek, Robert (1979). Franklin D. Roosevelt and American foreign policy, 1932-1945. Oxford University Press.
 Pratt, Julius W. (1964). Cordell Hull, 1933–44, 2 vol.
 Biography at U.S. Congress
 .
 O'Sullivan, Christopher D., and Sumner Welles (2008). Postwar Planning and the Quest for a New World Order. Columbia University Press. .
 Gellman, Irwin F. (2002). Secret Affairs: FDR, Cordell Hull, and Sumner Welles''. Enigma Books. .
 Robertson, Charles Langner. "The American Secretary of State: A Study of the Office Under Henry L. Stimson And Cordell Hull." (PhD dissertation, Princeton University; ProQuest Dissertations Publishing, 1959. 6005044).
 Woolner, David B. (1996). "The Frustrated Idealists: Cordell Hull, Anthony Eden and the Search for Anglo-American Cooperation, 1933– 1938" (PhD dissertation). McGill University.

External links 

 
 The Cordell Hull Foundation, a non-profit NGO, based around furthering international peace and co-operation.
 The Cordell Hull Institute, a U.S. think-tank focusing on furthering debate in international economic development and trade.
 The Cordell Hull Museum, located in Byrdstown, Tennessee, focusing on Hull's life and work.
 Cordell Hull Birthplace State Park
 

|-

|-

|-

|-

|-

|-

1871 births
1955 deaths
20th-century American politicians
American military personnel of the Spanish–American War
American Nobel laureates
Burials at Washington National Cathedral
Candidates in the 1928 United States presidential election
Candidates in the 1940 United States presidential election
Cumberland School of Law alumni
Democratic Party members of the United States House of Representatives from Tennessee
Democratic National Committee chairs
Democratic Party United States senators from Tennessee
Franklin D. Roosevelt administration cabinet members
Democratic Party members of the Tennessee House of Representatives
Military personnel from Tennessee
Nobel Peace Prize laureates
People from Pickett County, Tennessee
Presidents of the American Society of International Law
Tennessee state court judges
United States Secretaries of State
World War II political leaders
Deaths from sarcoidosis